Tommy "The Boiler" McGuinness is an Irish former Gaelic footballer who played for the Meath county team. He had much success playing inter-county football from around 1929 to the early forties on the Meath team. When he initially broke on to the Meath Team he usually played at midfield or centre forward. He played for a number of clubs, winning county titles with three clubs, but is best remembered playing for Navan Gaels. He is remembered for being a big, strong, robust player, regarded as a tough man, never too far removed from controversy whether on the pitch or in the meeting room. There are one or two gaps in his CV and the men who remember those bygone days recall that there were varying degrees of clashes with officialdom which caused his omission from time to time - most notably the National Football League success of 1933 when he should have been at the height of his career. In the 1930 Leinster Final against Kildare he was played Full Forward, a game which Meath drew. They lost the replay but at the time Kildare were rated highly and it seemed only a matter of time until Meath made the break through. The following year Kildare again got the better of Meath in a replay. In 1934 he was moved to the position he is most famous for playing in, full back. In 1939 Meath finally made the break through in winning the Leinster Championship and reaching the All Ireland Final, the height of the Boilers Career. The following year he played in the League final (as full forward) as Meath lost to Mayo. In 1987 McGuinness died and is buried in Navan.

External links
 Official Meath Website
  Hoganstand.com article

1987 deaths
Gaelic football backs
Meath inter-county Gaelic footballers
Navan Gaels Gaelic footballers
People from Navan
Year of birth missing